Joe Smith was an African-American man who was lynched by a mob in Yazoo City, Mississippi, on July 7, 1927.

The Decatur Daily reported that Joe Smith attempted to "attack" a "young white girl" on July 6, and when discovered by the father, used the girl as a shield to protect himself from the father's gun. Smith was captured and "spirited away" by a group of men after the girl had identified him; Sheriff W. T. Shirley and his deputies attempted to find him, but said he was likely to be lynched. Soon after, the bullet-riddled body was found hanging from a tree, some 17 miles from Yazoo City.
 
John R. Steelman, who wrote his PhD dissertation on "mob action in the South", listed Joe Smith as one of the cases, and phrased it thus: "Joe Smith is alleged to have 'attempted to attack a young white girl'. On July 7 his body, 'full of hot lead', was found hanging to the limb of a tree."

References

External links

1927 in Mississippi
1927 murders in the United States
Deaths by person in Mississippi
History of Yazoo County, Mississippi
July 1927 events
Lynching deaths in Mississippi
Murdered African-American people
People murdered in Mississippi
Race-related controversies in the United States
Racially motivated violence against African Americans